Nannodiplax is a genus of dragonflies in the family Libellulidae. 
There is only one known species of this genus which occurs in New Guinea and Australia.

Species
The genus Nannodiplax includes a single species:

Nannodiplax rubra

References

Libellulidae
Anisoptera genera
Monotypic Odonata genera
Odonata of Australia
Taxa named by Friedrich Moritz Brauer